Utu or UTU can refer to the following things:

Utu, a Sumerian deity
Utu language
Utu (Māori concept), a Māori word referring to a ritualised revenge or payback to restore balance
 Utu (film), a New Zealand film
Utu (gunboat), an Estonian gunboat during World War II
The Ulster Teachers' Union
The United Transportation Union
Teuku Umar University (Universitas Teuku Umar), a university in Indonesia
University of Turku
Untriunium, a hypothetical chemical element
Utah Tech University, the recently announced new name of Dixie State University in St. George, Utah
Uttarakhand Technical University, a state science and technology university in Uttarakhand, India
Utu, Estonia, village in Käina Parish, Hiiu County, Estonia
Fibera KK-1e Utu, glider